Round Lake (Weagamow Lake) Water Aerodrome  is located on Weagamow Lake near Round Lake, Ontario, Canada.

See also
 Round Lake (Weagamow Lake) Airport

References

Registered aerodromes in Kenora District
Seaplane bases in Ontario